Henri Scharry (10 December 1904 – 4 February 1954) was a Luxembourgian footballer. He competed in the men's tournament at the 1928 Summer Olympics.

References

External links
 

1904 births
1954 deaths
Luxembourgian footballers
Luxembourg international footballers
Olympic footballers of Luxembourg
Footballers at the 1928 Summer Olympics
Sportspeople from Esch-sur-Alzette
Association football goalkeepers
Jeunesse Esch players